Zond 3MV-1 No.2 (or No. 4A ), also known as Venera 1964A in the West, was a Soviet spacecraft, which was launched in 1964 as part of the Zond program. Due to a problem with its carrier rocket third stage, it failed to reach low Earth orbit.

Launch 

Zond 3MV-1 No.2 was launched at 05:47:40 UTC on 19 February 1964, atop a Molniya 8K78M carrier rocket flying from Site 1/5 at the Baikonur Cosmodrome. During ascent, LOX entered an RP-1 duct due to a leaking valve and formed a glob of explosive gel, so when core separation and Blok I ignition began, the thrust section exploded. The remains of the stage and probe landed 52 miles (85 kilometers) north of the town of Barabinsk in Siberia.

See also
 List of missions to Venus
Zond failed missions

References

Zond program
Spacecraft launched in 1964
1964 in the Soviet Union
3MV